In geometry, the small complex icosidodecahedron is a degenerate uniform star polyhedron. Its edges are doubled, making it degenerate. The star has 32 faces (20 triangles and 12 pentagons), 60 (doubled) edges and 12 vertices and 4 sharing faces. The faces in it are considered as two overlapping edges as topological polyhedron.

A small complex icosidodecahedron can be constructed from a number of different vertex figures.

A very similar figure emerges as a geometrical truncation of the great stellated dodecahedron, where the pentagram faces become doubly-wound pentagons ({5/2} --> {10/2}), making the internal pentagonal planes, and the three meeting at each vertex become triangles, making the external triangular planes.

As a compound
The small complex icosidodecahedron can be seen as a compound of the icosahedron {3,5} and the great dodecahedron {5,5/2} where all vertices are precise and edges coincide. The small complex icosidodecahedron resembles an icosahedron, because the great dodecahedron is completely contained inside the icosahedron.

Its two-dimensional analogue would be the compound of a regular pentagon, {5}, representing the icosahedron as the n-dimensional pentagonal polytope, and regular pentagram, {5/2}, as the n-dimensional star. These shapes would share vertices, similarly to how its 3D equivalent shares edges.

See also
 Great complex icosidodecahedron
 Small complex rhombicosidodecahedron
 Complex rhombidodecadodecahedron
 Great complex rhombicosidodecahedron

References
 (Table 6, degenerate cases)
 
 

Polyhedra
Polyhedral compounds